The Boy Scouts of America (BSA, colloquially the Boy Scouts) is one of the largest scouting organizations and one of the largest youth organizations in the United States, with about 1.2 million youth participants. The BSA was founded in 1910, and since then, about 110 million Americans have participated in BSA programs. BSA is part of the international Scout Movement and became a founding member organization of the World Organization of the Scout Movement in 1922.

The stated mission of the Boy Scouts of America is to "prepare young people to make ethical and moral choices over their lifetimes by instilling in them the values of the Scout Oath and Law." Youth are trained in responsible citizenship, character development, and self-reliance through participation in a wide range of outdoor activities, educational programs, and, at older age levels, career-oriented programs in partnership with community organizations. For younger members, the Scout method is part of the program to instill typical Scouting values such as trustworthiness, good citizenship, and outdoors skills, through a variety of activities such as camping, aquatics, and hiking. To further these outdoor activities, the BSA has four high-adventure bases: Northern Tier (Minnesota, Manitoba, and Ontario), Philmont Scout Ranch (New Mexico), Sea Base (Florida, US Virgin Islands, and Bahamas), and Summit Bechtel Reserve (West Virginia), as well as nearly one hundred separate camps and reservations specifically dedicated to scouts.

The main Scouting divisions are Cub Scouting for ages 5 to 11 years, Scouts BSA for ages 10 to 18, Venturing for ages 14 through 21, and Sea Scouts for ages 14 through 21. The BSA operates Scouting by chartering local organizations, such as churches, clubs, civic associations, or educational organizations, to implement the Scouting program for youth within their communities. Units are led entirely by volunteers appointed by the chartering organization, who are supported by local councils using both paid professional Scouters and volunteers. Additionally, Learning for Life is an affiliate that provides in-school and career education.

On February 1, 2019, the Boy Scouts of America renamed its flagship program, Boy Scouts, to Scouts BSA to reflect its policy change allowing girls to join separate, gender-specific troops. Shortly thereafter, the largest charter organization supporting BSA, The Church of Jesus Christ of Latter-day Saints, decided to part ways substantially contributing to a net loss of nearly a million scouts/leaders. On February 18, 2020, the National BSA filed for Chapter 11 bankruptcy protection and is currently restructuring its financial situation. On November 16, 2020, the National BSA disclosed in their bankruptcy filings that over 92,000 former Scouts had reported sexual abuse by members of the organization. In December 2021, the insurer for the Boy Scouts of America agreed to pay $800M into the fund for victims.

Origins

The progressive movement in the United States was at its height during the early 20th century. With the migration of families from farms to cities, there were concerns among some people that young men were no longer learning patriotism, self-reliance, and individualism. Several groups attempted to fill this void. The YMCA was an early promoter of reforms for young men with a focus on social welfare and programs of mental, physical, social and religious development. Others, included the Woodcraft Indians started by Ernest Thompson Seton in 1902 in Cos Cob, Connecticut, and the Sons of Daniel Boone founded by Daniel Carter Beard in 1905 in Cincinnati, Ohio., two notable independent scouting predecessors of BSA within the United States.

In 1907, Robert Baden-Powell founded the Scouting movement in England using elements of Seton's works among other influences. In 1909, Chicago publisher W. D. Boyce was visiting London, where he encountered a boy who came to be known as the Unknown Scout. Boyce was lost on a foggy street when an unknown Scout came to his aid, guiding him to his destination. The boy then refused Boyce's tip, explaining that he was a Boy Scout and was merely doing his daily good turn. Interested in the Boy Scouts, Boyce met with staff at the Boy Scouts Headquarters and, by some accounts, Baden-Powell. Upon his return to the US, Boyce was inspired by his experience and incorporated the Boy Scouts of America on February 8, 1910. Edgar M. Robinson and Lee F. Hanmer became interested in the nascent BSA and convinced Boyce to turn the program over to the YMCA for development in April 1910. Robinson enlisted Seton, Beard, Charles Eastman, and other prominent leaders in the early youth movements. Former president Theodore Roosevelt, who had long complained of the decline in American manhood, became an ardent supporter. In January 1911, Robinson turned the movement over to James E. West who became the first Chief Scout Executive and Scouting began to expand in the US Among other programs in the US, the Woodcraft Indians and Sons of Daniel Boone, eventually merged with the BSA.

The BSA's stated purpose at its incorporation in 1910 was "to teach [boys] patriotism, courage, self-reliance, and kindred values." Later, in 1937, Deputy Chief Scout Executive George J. Fisher expressed the BSA's mission: "Each generation as it comes to maturity has no more important duty than that of teaching high ideals and proper behavior to the generation which follows." The current mission statement of the BSA is "to prepare young people to make ethical and moral choices over their lifetimes by instilling in them the values of the Scout Oath and Law."

At its peak, Boy Scouts had an active membership of over 4 million youth in 1973. Today, popularity in outdoor events has waned and membership has dropped. However, BSA remains the largest scouting organization and one of the largest youth organizations in the United States, with about 1.2 million youth participants and about one million adult volunteers .

Federally chartered corporation

The BSA holds one of the comparatively rare congressional charters under Title 36 of the United States Code. On behalf of the BSA, Paul Sleman, Colin H. Livingstone, Ernest S. Martin, and James E. West successfully lobbied Congress for a federal charter for the BSA which President Woodrow Wilson signed on June 15, 1916. One of the principal reasons for seeking a congressional charter was to deal with competition from other Scout organizations including the United States Boy Scouts and the Lone Scouts of America. The 1916 statute of incorporation established this institution among a small number of similarly chartered patriotic and national organizations, such as the Girl Scouts, Civil Air Patrol, the American Legion, the Red Cross, Little League Baseball, and the National Academy of Sciences. The federal incorporation was originally construed primarily as an honor; however, it does grant the chartered organization some special privileges and rights, including freedom from antitrust and monopoly regulation and complete control over the organization's symbols and insignia,  though it neither implies nor accords Congress any special control over the BSA, which remains free to function independently.

Membership

Original programs

Boy Scouts of America uses four primary programs to achieve its aims in Scouting:
 Cub Scouting is available to youth from kindergarten through fifth grade.
 Scouts BSA (formerly Boy Scouts) is the flagship program of the BSA for youth ages 11 to 18; 10-year-olds can join after March 1 of their fifth grade year or if they have earned the Arrow of Light award.
 Venturing is the program for ages 14 to 21.
 Sea Scouting is the program for ages 14 to 21 focused on nautical activities.

There are about 100,000 physically or mentally disabled Scouts throughout the United States. Anyone certified as disabled "may enroll in Scouting and remain in its program beyond the regulation age limits. This provision allows all members to advance in Scouting as far as they wish."

Other programs
The Boy Scouts of America offers several other programs and subprograms beyond regular membership:
 The Order of the Arrow is the Scouting national honor society for experienced campers, based on American Indian traditions and is dedicated to the ideals of brotherhood and cheerful service. To be considered for membership one must live their life by the Scout Law, accomplish several requirements, and be elected by members of their unit.
 Lone Scouting is a program designed to allow those who would otherwise not be able to become Scouts or Cub Scouts—usually due to residence in an overseas/isolated community or unusual circumstances—to participate in the Scouting experience.
 STEM Scouts is a pilot program of the BSA that focuses on STEM learning and career development for boys and girls in elementary, middle, and high school.
 Learning for Life is a school and work-site based program that is a subsidiary of the BSA. It utilizes programs designed for schools and community-based organizations that are designed to prepare youth for the complexities of contemporary society and to enhance their self-confidence, motivation, and self-esteem. Exploring is the worksite-based program of Learning for Life with programs based on five areas of emphasis: career opportunities, life skills, citizenship, character education, and leadership experience. Learning for Life is not considered a regular Scouting program; it does not use the Scout Oath, Scout Law, uniforms, or insignia of regular Scouting. All Learning for Life programs are open to youth and adults without restriction based on gender, residence, sexual orientation, or other considerations other than age requirements.

Membership controversies

Unlike the BSA's Learning for Life, membership in the regular BSA programs had been more restricted and controversial. Until the late 2010s, Cub Scouting or the program then-named Boy Scouting was open to boys only, but girls were permitted to join the Venturing, Sea Scouting, and Explorers programs in 1970. Women could also serve as adult volunteers in all programs in approximately the same time frame. On October 11, 2017, the BSA announced that girls would be allowed to become Cub Scouts, starting in 2018, and be a part of the Scouts BSA Program, starting on February 1, 2019.

The BSA allowed gay youths full participation in 2014 and openly gay adults as leaders in 2015. It is a common belief that the BSA does prohibit members who are atheist and agnostic based on its "duty to God" principle and that members (adult and youth) agree with the Declaration of Religious Principle in the bylaws. However, the BSA has had Buddhist troops since 1920, and Buddhism is a nontheistic religion which does not assert belief in a creator God. The BSA also signed a Memorandum of Understanding with the Unitarian Universalist Association in 2016 which specifically gives ultimate authority over a participant's spiritual welfare to the individual Unitarian Universalist congregation. The MOU also specifically includes within Unitarian Universalist chartered troops Humanism as an acceptable form of spirituality as well as Earth-centered religions.

In 2000, the Supreme Court ruled in Boy Scouts of America v. Dale that Boy Scouts and all similar, private voluntary organizations have the constitutionally protected right under the First Amendment of freedom of association to set membership standards. In 2004, the BSA adopted a new policy statement, including a "Youth Leadership" policy that disallowed members to continue in leadership positions in the event they were to hold themselves out as "open and avowed homosexuals.

At the Scouts annual meeting in April 2012, a leader from the Northeast presented a resolution that "would allow individual units to accept gays as adult leaders". However, in July 2012, at the culmination of a review started in 2010, an 11-person committee convened by the BSA reached a "unanimous consensus" recommending retaining the current policy. Intel, UPS, and Merck cut financial ties with the BSA over the policy decision. Within the BSA National Executive Board, members James Turley, CEO of Ernst & Young, and Randall Stephenson, CEO of AT&T and who was then "on track to become president of the Scout's national board in 2014" and later was, publicly opposed the policy and stated their intention "to work from within the BSA Board to actively encourage dialogue and sustainable progress" in changing the policy. On January 28, 2013, the BSA announced it was considering rescinding the ban on homosexuals, allowing chartered organizations to determine local policy.

On May 23, 2013, 61% of the 1,400-member BSA National Council voted to remove the restriction denying membership to youth on the basis of sexual orientation while emphasizing that any sexual conduct, whether heterosexual or homosexual, is not allowed. The resolution went into effect on January 1, 2014, but Scout leaders who were "open and avowed homosexuals" were still prohibited. The policy specifically states that BSA does not inquire into a person's sexuality. Gay rights groups hailed the decision, but vowed to press on until all gay members were accepted. Some churches and conservative members threatened to quit the Boy Scouts in response. On June 12, 2013, the Southern Baptist Convention passed non-binding resolutions urging the BSA not to change their policy. In September 2013, a new scouting group called Trail Life USA was created, in support of what founders call "traditional, Christian" scouting. Subsequently, some Christian denomination congregations replaced their Boy Scouts of America troops with those of Trail Life USA.

In May 2015, Boy Scouts of America President Robert Gates said it was time to end the ban on gay leaders. Gates said it "cannot be sustained" any longer. On July 10, 2015, the Boy Scouts of America Executive Committee agreed, and referred the matter to the National Executive Board. On July 27, 2015, the Boy Scouts of America National Executive Board voted to lift the organization's blanket ban on openly gay leaders and employees. Local chartering organizations are still permitted to set their own standards based on religious principle for selecting the adult volunteers for their unit.

On January 30, 2017, the Boy Scouts of America announced that transgender children who identify as boys would be allowed to enroll in boys-only programs, effective immediately. Previously, the sex listed on an applicant's birth certificate determined eligibility for these programs; going forward, the decision would be based on the gender listed on the application. Joe Maldonado became the first openly transgender child identifying as a boy to join the Scouts on February 7, 2017. In 2016, he was rejected from the Boy Scouts for being transgender, but the policy was changed after his story became nationally known.

On October 11, 2017, the Boy Scouts of America announced that girls would be welcomed into Cub Scouts beginning in fall of 2018, with an early adopter program beginning on January 15, 2018, in councils that wished to participate early. The announcement included the statement that girls in Cub Scouting will simply be called "Cub Scouts". The flagship program of Boy Scouts of America, previously known as "Boy Scouting", became known as Scouts BSA on February 1, 2019, when the program opened to girls. Members of Scouts BSA are known as "Scouts". On November 6, 2018, the GSUSA filed a federal trademark lawsuit seeking to block the BSA from rebranding itself simply as "Scouts"; this is not the first time the two organizations have legally contested the use of the term scout.

Program

Aims, methods, and ideals

The objectives of the BSA are referred to as the Aims of Scouting: Character, Citizenship, Personal Fitness, Leadership. The BSA pursues these aims through an informal education system called the Scout method, with variations that are designed to be appropriate for the age and maturity of each membership division.

Cub Scouts wear a uniform that gives each Scout a level of identity within the den, the pack and the community. The Scouts learn teamwork by meeting and working together in a den of four to ten boys or girls under adult leadership. They learn and apply the ideals codified in the Scout Oath and the Scout Law through an advancement system using age-based ranks earned by completing required and elective adventures. Some advancement is done in the home and is intended to involve the entire family and many Cub Scout activities include family members.

In the Scouts BSA program, Scouts learn to use the ideals spelled out in the Scout Oath, the Scout Law, the Outdoor Code, the Scout motto ("Be prepared"), and the Scout slogan ("Do a good turn daily"). They wear a uniform and work together in patrols of four to ten Scouts with an elected patrol leader, who then appoints an assistant patrol leader. Scouts share responsibilities, apply skills learned at meetings and live together in the outdoors. The advancement system provides opportunities for personal growth and self-reliance. Scouts interact with adult leaders who act as role models and mentors, but they are expected to plan their own activities within the troop and to participate in community service.

Venturers are expected to know and live by the Scout Oath and Law. Before May 2014, members of the Venturing program followed the now discontinued Venturing Oath and Venturing Code. Venturers associate and work directly with adults advisors, but the crew is led by elected youth officers who are given opportunities to learn and apply leadership skills. Venturers plan and participate in interdependent group experiences dependent on cooperation. An emphasis on high adventure provides opportunities for team-building and practical leadership applications. A series of awards provide opportunities for recognition and personal growth. Each award requires the Venturer to teach what they have learned to others, thereby returning the skill and knowledge back to the community and enabling the Venturer to master those skills.

In October 2012, the National Council announced that, as a result of the findings and recommendations of a select committee made up of volunteer Scouters, the Cub Scout and Venturing programs would transition to use of the Scout Oath and Law, and in the case of the Venturers, the Boy Scout three-finger salute and sign as well. The Venturing change occurred in May 2014; and the Cub Scout change in mid-2015.

Ranks 

There are seven ranks that a Scout in the Scouts BSA program may attain (note that Eagle Palms are not considered ranks). To obtain a rank, a Scout must complete the requirements for that rank, as well as have a Scoutmaster Conference and a Board of Review (with the exception of Scout Rank).

The seven ranks that a Scout may earn are: Scout, Tenderfoot, Second Class, First Class, Star Scout, Life Scout, and Eagle Scout. Some merit badges and leadership positions require a certain rank before being given to the scout and certain ranks require different merit badges and leadership positions.

Eagle Scout

Eagle Scout is the highest rank one can receive in Scouts BSA. Since its introduction in 1911, the Eagle Scout rank has been earned by more than two million youth. Requirements include earning at least 21 merit badges and demonstrating Scout Spirit through the Scout Oath and Law, service, and leadership, all before or by age 18. This includes an extensive service project that the Scout plans, organizes, leads, and manages. Eagle Scouts are presented with a medal and a badge that visibly recognizes the accomplishments of the Scout. Additional recognition can be earned through Eagle Palms, awarded for completing additional tenure, leadership, and merit badge requirements.
Many famous Americans are Eagle Scouts: astronauts Neil Armstrong and Jim Lovell, film directors Michael Moore and Steven Spielberg, basketball Hall of Famer Bill Bradley and Olympic gold medalist Steven Holcomb, TV host Mike Rowe, Mayor Michael Bloomberg, Secretary of Defense Robert Gates, President Gerald Ford, and civil rights leader (and Tuskegee Airman) Percy Sutton are just a small sample of Eagle Scouts. Three recipients of the Medal of Honor—Thomas R. Norris, Mitchell Paige and Leo K. Thorsness—were Eagle Scouts.

Upon the introduction of girls into Scouts BSA in February 2019, a temporary time extension for Eagle rank was allowed for up to 2 years for all scouts who were older than 16 but not yet 18 years of age on February 1, 2019.

Of the 21 merit badges Eagle Scouts are required to earn, 14 of the badges must include: First Aid, Citizenship in the Community, Citizenship in the Nation, Citizenship in the World, Citizenship in Society, Communication, Cooking, Personal Fitness, Emergency Preparedness OR Lifesaving, Environmental Science OR Sustainability, Personal Management, Swimming OR Hiking OR Cycling, Camping, and Family Life.

National Scout Jamboree

The National Scout Jamboree is a gathering of Scouts and Venturers from across the US. It is usually held every four years, with some adjustment for special years such as the 2010 National Scout Jamboree that celebrated the BSA centennial. The first jamboree was held in 1937 at the Washington Monument in Washington, D.C. There were 27,232 Scouts and Leaders present at the first National Jamboree. In 1950, the Boy Scouts of America hosted their second National Jamboree at Valley Forge, Pennsylvania. The event was to commemorate the organization's 40th anniversary. Since then, jamborees have been held in varying locations. From 1981 until 2010, the jamboree was held at Fort A.P. Hill, Virginia. A permanent location owned by the BSA was sought in 2008 for future jamborees, high adventure programs and training. The Summit Bechtel Family National Scout Reserve near Beckley, West Virginia, is now the permanent site beginning with the 2013 National Scout Jamboree.

High adventure
The Boy Scouts of America operates several high-adventure bases at the national level. Each offers a wide range of programs and training; a typical core program may include sailing, wilderness canoeing or wilderness backpacking trips. These bases are administered by the High Adventure Division of the National Council.

Current high-adventure bases of the Boy Scouts of America include Philmont Scout Ranch, Northern Tier National High Adventure Bases, Florida National High Adventure Sea Base, and The Summit Bechtel Family National Scout Reserve.

Equipment
The Boy Scouts of America have functioned as a licensor and distributor of official Boy Scout uniforms, camping gear, and other items since the 1920s. These include backpacks, pocket knives, belt knives, tents, sleeping bags, canteens, and mess gear.

Training

The BSA offers a wide variety of mandatory and optional training programs in youth protection, outdoor skills and leadership.

Adult leader training
Every adult leader must complete Youth Protection Training, and then is strongly encouraged to complete a general overview training called This is Scouting, and a Fast Start training specific to his/her program level. Position-specific training is required for all direct-contact leaders. Upon completion of basic training, a leader may wear the Trained emblem on his/her BSA uniform.

Supplemental skill-specific training is also available to BSA volunteers to gain knowledge in outdoors skills including camping, hiking, first aid, Leave No Trace, swim safety, climbing safety, hazardous weather, and other skills.

The highest level of BSA training is Wood Badge, focused on helping participants develop leadership skills while participating in an outdoor program over five days. Some councils offer high-adventure training for adults using the Powder Horn program. Leaders can also take the Seabadge advanced leadership and management course.

Youth leadership training
Scout youth leaders may attend the unit-level Introduction to Leadership Skills for Troops. Local councils offer the advanced National Youth Leadership Training and the National Council offers the National Advanced Youth Leadership Experience conducted at Philmont Training Center. The Boy Scouts of America also offers the NYLT Leadership Academy which trains youth staff members from across the country for council-level NYLT courses.

Venturers and Sea Scouts may attend the unit-level Introduction to Leadership Skills for Crews or Introduction to Leadership Skills for Ships. Crew officers can attend Crew Officer Orientation, and then a council-provided Kodiak leadership training program

Order of the Arrow members may attend the National Leadership Seminar, run multiple times each year by each region.

National Camping School
The Boy Scouts of America operates a National Camping School program which trains people how to run various departments or areas at the Scouts BSA summer camps. Some online training is offered, but most areas require an in-person week-long training program at one of the National Camping Schools. After successfully completing a week-long program, a person is entitled to wear the National Camping School patch. The regular-size patch may be worn on the right breast shirt pocket, in the temporary patch spot. National Camping School certification is valid for five years.

Love of outdoors

Scouts see nature as an adventurous place, and it is expected that when they get older the experience from their youth will make them nature lovers. Scouts envisage nature as a heritage.

Organization

National Council

The National Council is the corporate membership of the Boy Scouts of America and consists of volunteer Scouters who meet annually. The day-to-day operations of the National Council are administered by the Chief Scout Executive and other national professional staff. National Council members include volunteers who are elected national officers and executive board members, regional presidents, the local council representatives, members at large, and honorary members. The national headquarters has been in Irving, Texas since 1979.

Since the founding of the BSA in 1910, the President of the United States has served as the organization's honorary president during his term in office, former presidents serve as honorary vice presidents for their lifetimes.

Governance and the National Executive Board

The BSA National Executive Board governs the organization. The 2015 National Executive Board consisted of 79 members.

The board is led by the national president, a volunteer elected by the National Council. Board members included regular elected members, regional presidents, and up to five appointed youth members. The Chief Scout Executive is the board secretary and non-voting member. The National Executive Board has a number of standing committees that correspond to the professional staff organization of the National Council.

Present and past members of the National Executive Board include Utah Senator Mitt Romney, Ernst & Young CEO Jim Turley and AT&T CEO Randall Stephenson. Other members included Latter-day Saint Church President Thomas S. Monson.

Groups and divisions

The Program Impact Division is responsible for developing the Scouting program and includes the volunteer committees and staff working on volunteer training, youth development, and other program impact needs. The All Markets membership emphasis includes focus groups and special committees working to improve outreach to youth and families in various underserved ethnic populations, with literature and marketing materials targeting Hispanic/Latino families, Asian-American families, and African-American families. The BSA also participates in the American Indian Scouting Association in partnership with the Girl Scouts.

The Outdoor Adventure Division oversees four high adventure bases: Northern Tier (Minnesota, Manitoba, and Ontario), Philmont Scout Ranch (New Mexico), Sea Base (Florida, US Virgin Islands, and Bahamas), and Summit Bechtel Reserve (West Virginia), over one hundred separate camps and reservations specifically dedicated to scouts, and other special programs such as the Order of the Arrow.

Other divisions provides support for the world and national jamborees and International Scouting relations. The Membership Impact Division works to sustain marketing efforts and relationships with the national organizations that make up the predominant number of chartered organizations, such as Lions International, Rotary International, Kiwanis International, American Legion, Elks, VFW, and all religious denominations chartering BSA units.

The National Supply Group is responsible for developing and selling uniforms, apparel, insignia, literature, and equipment. It sells equipment and supplies through National Scout Shops, local council trading posts, authorized independent resellers, and online at ScoutShop.org. Supply Group also licenses trademarks for use by other commercial vendors. The Administrative Group provides internal administration service and support. It includes the Marketing and Communications Division responsible for marketing the BSA program, administering the national websites, and publishing Scouting for adult leaders and Scout Life (formerly Boys' Life) for youth.

The National Scouting Museum is located at Philmont Scout Ranch in New Mexico. Exhibits include high adventure sections, hands-on learning experiences, interactive exhibits, and a historical collection tracing uniforms, themes, and documents from the beginning of the Scouting movement in America. Among the museum's artifacts are the Eagle Scout medal of Arthur Rose Eldred, the first Eagle Scout.

The National Court of Honor certifies the BSA's highest awards: lifesaving and meritorious action awards, distinguished service awards, Eagle Scout and the Quartermaster Award.

National Service Territories
For administrative purposes, the BSA is divided into 16 National Service Territories (NSTs) including international areas for scouts with parents serving outside the US. Each NST encompasses multiple states or portions of states/counties.

Local councils

The BSA program is administered through  local councils, with each council covering a geopolitical area that may vary from a single city to an entire state. Councils receive an annual charter from the National Council and are usually incorporated as a charitable organization.

The council level organization is similar to that of the National Council. The council executive board is headed by the council president and is made up of annually elected local community leaders. The board establishes the council program and carries out the resolutions, policies, and activities of the council. Board members serve without pay and some are volunteer Scouters working at the unit level. Youth members may be elected to the council executive board according to the council by-laws.

The Scout executive manages council operations—including finance, property management, advancement and awards, registrations, and Scout Shop sales—with a staff of other professionals and para-professionals. Volunteer commissioners lead the unit service functions of the council, help maintain the standards of the BSA, and assure a healthy unit program.

The BSA charters two councils for American Scouts living overseas, largely on military bases in Europe and Asia. The Transatlantic Council, headquartered in Livorno, Italy, serves BSA units in much of Europe, and the Far East Council, headquartered in Japan, serves units in the western Pacific areas. The Direct Service branch makes the Scouting movement available to US citizens and their dependents living in countries outside these jurisdictions or in isolated areas. The Aloha Council in Hawaii also serves BSA units in the American territories of American Samoa, Guam, the Northern Mariana Islands and in the sovereign countries of the Federated States of Micronesia, the Marshall Islands, and Palau.

The Greater New York Councils are unique in that they are divided into five boroughs with each led by a borough Scout executive and each borough then divided into districts.

Councils are divided into districts with leadership provided by the district executive, district chairman, and the district commissioner. Districts are directly responsible for the operation of Scouting units and, except for the district executive, are mostly staffed with volunteers. The voting members of each district consist of volunteer representatives from each chartered organization having at least one BSA unit, plus annually elected members-at-large who in turn elect the district chairman. Boroughs and districts are subdivisions of the local council and do not have a separate corporate status.

Chartered organizations and units

The Boy Scouts of America partners with community organizations, such as religious congregations, fraternal groups, service clubs, and other community associations, to provide the Scouting program for the particular neighborhood or community in which the particular organization wishes to reach out to youth and families. These organizations hold charters issued by the BSA and are known then as chartered organizations. Each chartered organization provides the meeting place for BSA youth, oversees the volunteer leaders, and agrees to follow the basic BSA safety policies and values-based program, and the organization is considered the "owner" of its local program, much like a franchise.

Within each chartered organization, there may be one or more "units". A unit is a group of youth and adults which are collectively designated as a Cub Scout pack, Boy Scout troop, Venturing crew, or Sea Scout ship. Each chartered organization may charter as many units as it wishes, but usually only 3 or 4 (one unit for each program level). The BSA council provides the leader training, inter-unit activities, camping programs, volunteer and professional support, and insurance coverage. Units also create their own activities (such as monthly camping trips, outings, or service projects), and most meet weekly at the place of the chartered organization for youth to learn basic skill development and practice leadership in small groups known as dens and patrols.

The Church of Jesus Christ of Latter-day Saints was the first partner to sponsor Scouting in the United States. It adopted the program in 1913 as part of its Mutual Improvement Association program for young men, and it was the largest single sponsor of Scouting until it ceased sponsoring Scouting units at the end of 2019.

The BSA at its peak reportedly had 4.8 million members in the 1970s with its membership plunging to less than half across its 266 local councils; down from 2.9 million in 2006 to roughly 2.3 million youth members just over a decade later.

Leadership

All Scouting units above the Cub Scout pack (i.e. units serving adolescent Scouts), leadership of the unit comprises both adult leaders (Scouters) and youth leaders (Scouts). In fact, this is a critical component of the program. In order to learn leadership, the youth must actually serve in leadership roles. Adult leaders may be either men or women in all positions.

A properly run Scouts BSA troop is run by the Senior Patrol Leader, who is elected by the troop, and their assistant, who may either be elected or appointed. These and the other youth leaders are advised and supported by the adult leaders. "Scouts are youth-led."

Finance
The National Council is incorporated as a 501(c)(3) non-profit organization and is funded from private donations, membership dues, corporate sponsors, and special events with total revenues of $237 million.

In addition to donations from individuals, the BSA receives extensive donations from major corporations. In 2010, their top corporate donors were, in order, Intel, Emerson, Verizon, 3M, Bank of America, Wells Fargo, Pfizer, Valero, UPS, U.S. Bank, Eli Lilly, GE, and Monsanto.

Impact on American life

Scouting and Boy Scouts are well known throughout American culture and approximately 110 million Americans have participated in BSA programs at some time in their lives. The term "Boy Scout" is used to generally describe someone who is earnest and honest, or who helps others cheerfully; it can also be used as a pejorative term for someone deemed to be overly idealistic.

Prominent Americans in diverse walks of life, from filmmaker Steven Spielberg (who helped launch a merit badge in cinematography) to adventurer Steve Fossett to U.S. presidents, were BSA members as youths. Over two-thirds of all astronauts have had some type of involvement in Scouting, and eleven of the twelve men to walk on the Moon were Scouts, including Eagle Scouts Neil Armstrong and Charlie Duke. The pinewood derby—a wood car racing event for Cub Scouts—has been declared "a celebrated rite of spring" and was named part of "America's 100 Best" by Reader's Digest.

President Gerald Ford said, "I can say without hesitation, because of Scouting principles, I know I was a better athlete, I was a better naval officer, I was a better congressman, and I was a better prepared President."

Famed American illustrator Norman Rockwell's works were closely associated with the Boy Scouts of America for much of the 20th century. Beginning in 1913, Rockwell began illustrating covers of Boys' Life, the magazine for BSA youth. He also drew the organization's annual calendar illustrations between 1925 and 1976.

As part of the US Bicentennial celebrations in 1976, Rockwell's Scouting paintings toured the nation and were viewed by 280,000 people. In 2008, a twelve-city US tour of Rockwell's works was scheduled.

Alvin Townley wrote in Legacy of Honor about the large positive impact of Eagle Scouts in America. Townley cited such examples as how Scouts, especially Eagle Scouts, were disproportionately represented among Hurricane Katrina's volunteer relief workers; just as they are disproportionately represented among members of the United States Senate. Former Governor Rick Perry of Texas is an Eagle Scout who defended BSA policies and restrictions against ACLU criticisms in his book, On My Honor: Why the American Values of the Boy Scouts Are Worth Fighting For.

Mark Mays, CEO of Clear Channel Communications, told a magazine interviewer in May 2008 that, "Particularly in the very impactful ages of youth 11 to 14 years old, when they can really go astray and you're taking the time to spend with them and focus on cultural core values like reverent, trustworthy, loyal, and helpful—all of those different things ... Scouting has a huge positive impact on boys and their lives, and that in turn positively impacts our communities and society as a whole."

Mayor of New York City and business tycoon Michael Bloomberg, said that the BSA's Scout Law required of all Boy Scouts—a Scout is trustworthy, loyal, helpful, friendly, courteous, kind, obedient, cheerful, thrifty, brave, clean, and reverent—are "all the American values ... Americans have quaintly simplistic ways and direct ways of phrasing things ... I think it's one of the great strengths of this country."

Peter Applebome, an editor of The New York Times, wrote in 2003 of his experience as an adult participating with his son in Scouting activities, "I feel lucky to have had this unexpected vehicle to share my son's youth, to shape it, and to be shaped by it as well." He concluded that, although Scouting is viewed by some as old-fashioned, "Scouting's core values ... are wonderful building blocks for a movement and a life. Scouting's genuinely egalitarian goals and instincts are more important now than they've ever been. It's one of the only things that kids do that's genuinely cooperative, not competitive."

At the turn of the 20th century, Halloween had turned into a night of vandalism, with destruction of property and cruelty to animals and people. Around 1912, the BSA, Boys Clubs and other neighborhood organizations came together to encourage a safe celebration that would end the destruction that had become so common on this night.

The Boy Scouts of America are quite particular about how and when the Scout uniforms and insignia may be used in film and other portrayals; and for that reason, most films and television productions made in the US utilize "ersatz" Scouting organizations. Examples of this include the "Order of the Straight Arrow", portrayed in the King of the Hill cartoon series, and the "Indian Guides" depicted in the 1995 Chevy Chase film, Man of the House. One exception to this policy is the Walt Disney movie Follow Me, Boys! with Fred McMurray portraying a Scoutmaster of a rural troop. It was released to theaters in 1966 and re-released in 1976. Another is the final scene of The Sopranos television show, where Tony Soprano sits down to dinner in a restaurant. At another table, several Cub Scouts, in full uniform, are seated.

Good Turns

From the inception of the Scouting movement, Scouts have been urged to "Do a Good Turn Daily", as it is the slogan for the Boy Scouts of America. The first national Good Turn was the promotion of a safe and sane Fourth of July in 1912. During World War I, Every Scout to Save a Soldier was a slogan used to motivate children involved in Boy Scouts and Girl Scouts to help sell War savings stamps. Scouting for Food is an ongoing annual program begun in 1986 that collects food for local food banks.

In 1997, the BSA developed Service to America with a commitment to provide 200 million hours of service by youth members by the end of the year 2000. As part of Service to America, the BSA provided service projects in conjunction with the National Park Service. In October 2003, the Department of the Interior expanded the program with the creation of Take Pride in America, opening service to all Americans. Service to America became Good Turn for America in 2004 and expanded to address the problems of hunger, homelessness, and inadequate housing and poor health in conjunction with the Salvation Army, the American Red Cross, Habitat for Humanity, and other organizations.

Sex abuse cases

Scouting sex-abuse cases are situations where youth involved in Scouting programs have been sexually abused by someone who is also involved in the Scouting program. J.L. Tarr, a US Chief Scout Executive in the 1980s, was quoted in an article regarding sexual assault cases against Scout leaders across all 50 states: "That's been an issue since the Boy Scouts began." Several reports have surfaced over the years regarding incidents of sexual abuse within the Boy Scouts of America to include incidents of repeat offenders. There have also been several high-profile court cases that resulted in convictions and settlements involving such incidents. On October 19, 2012, the Boy Scouts of America were forced by court order to release over 20,000 pages of documentation on 1200 alleged child sexual abuse cases within the organization from between 1965 and 1985. Legal claims against BSA for such matters continue to the present day. Following its bankruptcy in February 2020, over 92,000 sexual abuse claims were filed with the bankruptcy court before the November 16, 2020 deadline to receive claims.

In the 1980s BSA developed its Youth Protection program, to educate youth, leaders and parents about the problem as a whole, and to introduce barriers to sexual abuse of children using the Scout program to reach victims. "Two deep" leadership dictates that no adult member can be alone with any youth member (other than their own child). Shortly after joining, youth must discuss with their parents a pamphlet on sexual abuse. Prior to joining, adults must take a youth protection training course, which is must be renewed every two years. Since 2003, new adult members must pass a criminal background check (adults who were already members had to pass a background check by 2008). The Youth Protection Plan from the organization is linked to in a CDC report on such programs.

Financial problems
In recent decades, membership in the BSA and income have declined. In addition, lawsuits arising from sexual misconduct by BSA volunteers and employees dating back to the 1960s further diluted available funds; according to public filings, nearly $12 million was paid to the law firm Ogletree Deakins over a three-year period from 2015 just for litigation counsel alone. In its 2018 annual report, BSA officials stated that the organization's future financial situation will be predicated on the outcome of various litigation and the associated direct costs to the organization. The annual report states that the BSA may have "to pay damages out of its own funds to the extent the claims are not covered by insurance or if the insurance carriers are unable or unwilling to honor the claims."

Accordingly, the BSA hired a law firm in December 2018 to investigate filing for Chapter 11 bankruptcy. Such a bankruptcy could stop litigation of at least 140 lawsuits and prevent further lawsuits. In October 2019, a substantial membership rate increase was announced related to increased operational expenses, especially substantial increases in insurance costs.

On February 18, 2020, the organization filed for bankruptcy in the Bankruptcy court of the U.S. District Court for the District of Delaware, listing liabilities of between $100 million and $500 million and assets of $1 billion to $10 billion. The bankruptcy filing came at a time when the organization faced hundreds of sexual abuse lawsuits. As a result of the filing, all civil litigation against the organization was suspended. Local Councils and units remained largely unaffected as they are standalone units. BSA contends that it alone should be financially responsible for any settlements in the sex abuse case lawsuits. Plaintiffs have complained that BSA is hiding its assets through its affiliates. Critics of the filing derisively described the organization and its move as "bankrupt, but not because it's broke."

Anti-bullying movement
Due to reports surfacing in the 1970s and 1980s regarding a high level of bullying in the Boy Scouts, efforts were made to develop a no-tolerance bully policy within the Boy Scouts of America. In the 1990s, the Boy Scouts acknowledged that the organization had a problem with bullying, in particular due to a "boys will be boys" attitude within Scouting before the 1970s, when adult leaders tended to overlook younger or weaker Scouts who were "picked on" by older boys, such adult leaders feeling that bullying "toughened someone up", labeling boys as "snitches" and "tattletales" should bullying be reported to the adult leadership.

One of the more widely published accounts of Boy Scout bullying occurred in July 1987 when a Boy Scout at the Goshen Scout Reservation was severely beaten in his sleep by several other Scouts. The incident resulted in the Goshen staff changing the layout of its campsites, to prevent having sites in extremely isolated areas, as well as assigning camp staff members to each visiting troop as "advisors" and also to watch for fights or other trouble resulting from conflicts developing at the various campsites.

In the 21st century, the Boy Scouts have adopted a "Bullying Awareness Program" which trains adults to recognize the signs of bullying, especially in isolated environments such as extended campouts in the wilderness or at summer camp. Parents are also advised on what to do, and whom to contact, should a Scout state they are being bullied by other Scouts. Dealing with the bullies themselves is also addressed, in particular those bullies who "game the system", pretending to be compassionate and apologetic to bully victims when adults confront them, only to return to such behaviors when the adults are no longer present.

Commemorations

References

Further reading

External links 
 
 
 
 
 
 FBI file on the Boy Scouts of America

 
.
Youth organizations based in the United States
World Organization of the Scout Movement member organizations
AmeriCorps organizations
Camping in the United States
Hiking organizations in the United States
Men's organizations in the United States
Organizations based in Irving, Texas
Youth organizations established in 1910
1910 establishments in the United States
Patriotic and national organizations chartered by the United States Congress
Articles containing video clips
Companies that filed for Chapter 11 bankruptcy in 2020
501(c)(3) organizations